Marcus Phillip Joseph Lopez (born 9 February 1992 in Barrigada, Guam) is a Guamanian international footballer who plays for the Guam national team.

Career
Lopez attended high school at St. John's School and later transferred to Harvest Christian Academy in Barrigada, Guam. He played from 2010 to 2011 for the Lasell College Lasers men's soccer team. In September 2011 he joined the Guam Men's Soccer League club Guam Shipyard.

In March 2013, Lopez joined Pachanga Diliman of the Filipino United Football League. In 2016, he joined the I-League side Minerva Punjab FC, where he scored 2 goals in 4 games.

International
He made his first appearance for the Guam national football team in 2012.

International goals
Scores and results list the Guam's goal tally first.

References
http://guamfa.com/forms/2014-15%20BSL%20D1%20Statistics-%20WEEK%2016.pdf

1992 births
Living people
Guamanian footballers
Guam Shipyard players
Expatriate soccer players in the United States
Guam international footballers
Expatriate footballers in the Philippines
People from Barrigada
Association football midfielders
Lasell College alumni
UC Irvine Anteaters men's soccer players
Expatriate footballers in India